Future Fear is a 1997 American science fiction film directed by Lewis Baumander.  The film stars Jeff Wincott as Dr. John Denniel, a geneticist who has found a cure to an extraterrestrial virus that threatens to kill everyone on earth.  General Wallace, played by Stacy Keach, wants to repopulate earth with a purely Aryan race of humans.  He sends an assassin, Maria Ford, to try to stop Dr. Denniel before he is able to save mankind from the virus. The action in the film takes place in the year 2018.

Cast
 Jeff Wincott as John Denniel
 Maria Ford as Anna Pontaine
 Stacy Keach as General Wallace
 Shawn Thompson as Robert
 Kristie Ropiejko as Yvette
 Michael Seater as Young Denniel
 Danielle Dasilva as Young Anna
 Robert Tinkler as Young Wallace
 Stephanie Jones as Deniel's Mother
 Michael Berger as Denniel's Father

References

External links

 
 

1998 science fiction films
1998 films
American science fiction films
1990s English-language films
1990s American films